David Davidson was a Scottish footballer, who played for Queen's Park and the  Scotland national squad in the 1870s and 1880s.

See also
List of Scotland national football team captains

References

Sources

External links

London Hearts profile

Year of birth missing
Year of death missing
Scottish footballers
Footballers from Glasgow
Scotland international footballers
Queen's Park F.C. players
Place of birth missing
Place of death missing
Association football midfielders